The Spanish Civil War is a book by British historian Hugh Thomas, first published in London by Eyre & Spottiswoode (xxix, 720 pages, illustrated with photos and maps). It won the Somerset Maugham Prize in 1962. A second revised edition was published by Penguin Books in 1965. A third, revised and enlarged edition was published in 1977 by Harper & Row, which was printed again in 2001 and 2013. Thomas said that the excellent reviews the book got on its release were a determining factor in his own life and career.

The book has been translated in various languages, among them Greek, French and Spanish.

Reception

Upon its release in 1961, John Murray called it "an exhaustive study, ably and conscientiously documented". In 1963, Robert G. Colodny wrote a similarly positive review, praising in particular the vast amount of research material examined.

Shortly after the death of Thomas, Pablo Guimón called it "a seminal book on the Spanish Civil War", "a highly influential work during the country's transition to democracy" and "a classic reference in the existing literature about the 1936–1939 period in Spanish history". Paul Preston  claimed that "it marked the first attempt at an objective general view" of the Civil War.

Richard Baxell wrote that "it is by no means faultless; there are many errors of fact and judgement and Thomas has rightly been accused of occasionally valuing narrative style above factual accuracy." Baxell is also critical of the faulty depiction of International Brigaders in the first edition.

Spanish translation

The book was forbidden in Francoist Spain. It was targeted by Francoist authorities, and was the target of a terrorist attack by a pro-Franco group. Copies were smuggled across the border with France, and Spaniards caught in possession of the book sometimes went to prison. For example a Valencian, Octavio Jordá, was caught at the French border having a pair of suitcases packed with many copies of the book. Jordá was later found guilty of "illegal propaganda" and "spreading communism", and sentenced to two years' imprisonment.
It wasn't until after Francisco Franco’s death in 1975 that the book could be freely distributed in Spain.

In response to Thomas's book, Franco's then minister of information, Manuel Fraga, set up an official centre for civil war studies to promote the regime's official historiography. So successful was the book that even Franco was regularly asked to comment on statements in it.

In 2016, Spanish historian Guillermo Sanz Gallego argued that the Spanish translator, José Martinez, manipulated his translation to follow an ideological pattern that favoured the Republican side. Moreover, the translation used less objective language than the original text when narrating events such as the assassinations of José Calvo Sotelo and Federico García Lorca. In the case of the Paracuellos massacres, the number of the deaths, several thousand in the original, was reduced to "approximately a thousand" (millar aproximado). Sanz Gallego's claims attracted attention from the media.

References

1961 non-fiction books
20th-century history books
British non-fiction books
English-language books
History books about Spain
History books about the 20th century
Spanish Civil War books